Purooruvase is a 1985 Indian Malayalam film,  directed by Kaviyoor Sivaprasad. The film stars  and Varanasi Narayanan Nampoothiri in lead roles. The film had musical score by Anand Sankar.

Cast
Varanasi Narayanan Nampoothiri

References

External links
 

1985 films
1980s Malayalam-language films
Films directed by Kaviyoor Sivaprasad